Boana poaju is a frog in the family Hylidae.  It is endemic to Brazil.

Original description

References

Boana
Amphibians described in 2008
Amphibians of Brazil
Endemic fauna of Brazil